Cenderawasih Bay ("Bird of Paradise Bay"), also known as Sarera Bay and formerly Geelvink Bay, is a large bay in northern Province of Papua, Central Papua and West Papua, New Guinea, Indonesia.

Geography 
Cenderawasih Bay is a large bay to the northwest of the Indonesian province of Papua, north of the province of Central Papua, and east of the province of West Papua, between the Bird's Head Peninsula and the mouth  of the Mamberamo River.

The bay is more than 300 kilometers wide.  The coastline from Manokwari, in the northwest of the bay, to Cape d'Urville at the mouth of the Mamberamo is more than 700 kilometers long.   To the south, the Wandammen peninsula heads north into the bay.  Important places along the coast are Manokwari, Ransiki, Wasior and Nabire.

The Wamma River, Tabai River, Warenai River, and Wapoga River empty into the Bay.

History 

The Dutch name of the bay was after the frigate De Geelvink with which Jacob Weyland sailed through the bay in 1705. The Dutch frigate was named after Geelvinck family.

The Tidore Sultanate had tributary ties with the region. Seafarers from the area used to regularly pay homage to the sultan.

Marine National park 

Teluk Cenderawasih National Park is located in the Teluk Cenderawasih.
In the Cenderawasih Bay extensive coral reefs exists. Parts of the area have been declared a protected marine reserve of 1.5 million hectares, the largest natural park in Southeast Asia.  
The western part of the bay was declared a marine national park in 2002. The Wondiwoi/Wandammen Natural Reserve of 730 km2 protects the great biodiversity of the Wandammen Peninsula.

Islands
In the bay is the archipelago known as the Schouten Islands (also called the Biak Islands, or Geelvink Islands), comprising Biak, the Padaido Islands, Supiori and Numfor (Numfoor). Further south in the bay is the 140 kilometer long island of Yapen (Japen). Smaller islands in the bay are Mios Num (Pulau Num), Rumberpon, Waar (or Meoswaar), Roon and Kurudu. 
The Mapia Islands lie to the north, and south of Palau.

West Papua Province
 Auri Islands archipelago (Kepulauan Auri)
 Meos Waar
 Rumberpon
 Roon Island
 Meos Angra

Papua Province
 Biak Islands (aka Schouten Islands):
 Biak
 Padaido Islands (Kepulauan Padaido)
 Numfor
 Supiori
 Yapen Islands
 Yapen
 Mios Num
 Kurudu
 Ambai Islands (Kepulauan Ambai)
 Kuran Islands (Kepulauan Kuran)

Central Papua Province
 Moora Islands archipelago (Kepulauan Moora)
 Anggrameos Island

See also
 
 Cenderawasih languages

References

 
Bays of Indonesia
Landforms of Western New Guinea
Landforms of Papua (province)
Landforms of West Papua (province)